Habrophila is a genus of moths belonging to the family Tineidae. This genus was described by Edward Meyrick in 1889. It consists of only one species, Habrophila compseuta, which is endemic to New Zealand.

Description of species

The wingspan is 11 mm. The forewings are very elongate and whitish-ochreous, suffusedly irrorated with dark fuscous, but less towards the base. The hindwings are whitish-grey.

References

External links

Image of type specimen of Habrophila compseuta

Tineidae
Monotypic moth genera
Moths of New Zealand
Endemic fauna of New Zealand
Taxa named by Edward Meyrick
Tineidae genera
Endemic moths of New Zealand